Edward Regan Murphy (born April 3, 1961) is an American actor, comedian, and singer. He rose to fame on the sketch comedy show Saturday Night Live, for which he was a regular cast member from 1980 to 1984. Murphy has also worked as a stand-up comedian and is ranked No. 10 on Comedy Central's list of the 100 Greatest Stand-ups of All Time. Murphy has received a Grammy Award and Emmy Award and was honored with the Mark Twain Prize for American Humor in 2015 and the Golden Globe Cecil B. DeMille Award in 2023.

Murphy has received Golden Globe Award nominations for his performances in 48 Hrs. (1982), the Beverly Hills Cop series (1984–present), Trading Places (1983), The Nutty Professor (1996), and Dolemite Is My Name (2019). He has also won numerous awards for his work on the fantasy comedy film Dr. Dolittle (1998) and its 2001 sequel. In 2007, Murphy won the Golden Globe for Best Supporting Actor and received a nomination for the Academy Award for Best Supporting Actor for his portrayal of soul singer James "Thunder" Early in the musical film Dreamgirls.

Murphy has worked as a voice actor, including roles playing Mushu in Disney's Mulan (1998), Thurgood Stubbs in the sitcom The PJs (1999–2001), and Donkey in DreamWorks Animation's Shrek series (2001–2010). He won the Annie Award for Outstanding Achievement for Voice Acting in a Feature Production for the latter. In some films he plays multiple roles in addition to his main character; this is intended as a tribute to one of his idols, Peter Sellers. He has played multiple roles in Coming to America (1988), Wes Craven's Vampire in Brooklyn (1995), the Nutty Professor films, Bowfinger (1999), The Adventures of Pluto Nash (2002), Norbit (2007), and Meet Dave (2008). He's recently starred in the comedy films Tower Heist (2011), Dolemite Is My Name (2019), Coming 2 America (2021), and You People (2023).

In 2020, he won his first Primetime Emmy Award for Outstanding Guest Actor in a Comedy Series for hosting Saturday Night Live. Murphy's films have grossed over $3.8 billion ( adjusted for inflation) in the United States and Canada box office, and over $6.7 billion worldwide. In 2015, his films made him the sixth-highest grossing actor in the United States. As a singer, Murphy has released three studio albums, including How Could It Be (1985), So Happy (1989), and Love's Alright (1993). He is also known for singing the hit song "Party All the Time" in 1985.

Early life
Murphy was born in Brooklyn, New York City and raised in the borough's Bushwick neighborhood. His mother, Lillian Murphy (née Laney, later Murphy Lynch; 1939-2000), was a telephone operator, and his father, Charles Edward Murphy (1940–1969), was a transit police officer and an amateur actor and comedian.

His father was murdered in 1969. He later stated:

When Murphy's single mother became ill, eight-year-old Murphy and his elder brother Charlie (1959-2017) lived in foster care for one year. In interviews, Murphy has said his time in foster care was influential in developing his sense of humor. Later, he and his brother were raised in Roosevelt, New York, by his mother and stepfather Vernon Lynch, a foreman at an ice cream plant.

Career

1976–1980: Early standup career
When Murphy was fifteen, he listened to Richard Pryor's comedy album That Nigger's Crazy, which inspired his decision to become a comedian. As a child, Murphy developed playing multiple characters in imitation of his acting hero, Peter Sellers. Other early influences included Bill Cosby, Redd Foxx, Robin Williams, Muhammad Ali, Bruce Lee, and Charlie Chaplin.

On July 9, 1976, the date with which Murphy marks the beginning of his career, he performed in a talent show at the Roosevelt Youth Center, doing an impersonation of singer Al Green as Green's song "Let's Stay Together" played. This led to work at other clubs within walking distance, and then late-night jobs at locations that required him to commute by train. To do this, he secretly skipped school, and after his mother discovered this at the end of his senior year, he was required to attend summer school.

1980–1989: Acting stardom

In the early 1980s, Murphy first earned national attention as a cast member on Saturday Night Live (SNL) and was credited with helping to revitalize the show. His characters included a grown-up version of the Little Rascals character Buckwheat; a streetwise children's show host named Mr. Robinson (parodying Fred Rogers, who found it amusing); and a morose, cynical Gumby, whose trademark slogan became an SNL catchphrase: "I'm Gumby, dammit!" According to Joseph Clokey, whose father Art Clokey created Gumby, both of them "thought Eddie was a genius in the way he played that character".

The Buckwheat character was retired in spectacular fashion—assassinated, on camera, in front of 30 Rockefeller Plaza—at Murphy's request, after he grew tired of constant demands from fans to "Do Buckwheat! Do Buckwheat!" In Rolling Stones February 2015 appraisal of all 141 SNL cast members to date, Murphy was ranked second (behind John Belushi). "It is customary (and accurate) to say that Eddie Murphy is the only reason SNL survived the five-year wilderness without Lorne Michaels", the magazine noted.

Murphy's early comedy was characterized by copious profanity and sketches lampooning a diverse group of people (including White Anglo-Saxon Protestants (WASPs), African Americans, Italian Americans, overweight people, and gay people). He released two stand-up specials. Delirious was filmed in 1983 in Washington, D.C. Due to the popularity of Delirious, his concert film, Eddie Murphy Raw (1987), received a wide theatrical release, grossing $50 million; the movie was filmed in the Felt Forum at Madison Square Garden in New York City.

Comedians who cite Murphy as influencing them include Russell Brand, Dave Chappelle, and Chris Rock.

In 1982, Murphy made his big-screen debut in the film 48 Hrs. with Nick Nolte. 48 Hrs. proved to be a hit when it was released during the Christmas season of 1982. Nolte was scheduled to host the December 11, 1982, Christmas episode of Saturday Night Live, but became too ill to host, so Murphy took over. He became the only cast member to host while still a regular. Murphy opened the show with the phrase, "Live from New York, It's the Eddie Murphy Show!"

The following year Murphy starred in Trading Places with fellow SNL alumnus Dan Aykroyd. The movie marked the first of Murphy's collaborations with director John Landis, who also directed Murphy in Coming to America (1988) and Beverly Hills Cop III (1994). Trading Places was an even greater box office success than 48 Hrs.

Murphy appeared in Best Defense (1984), co-starring Dudley Moore. Murphy, who was credited as a "Strategic Guest Star", was added to the film after an original version was completed but tested poorly with audiences. Best Defense was a major financial and critical disappointment. When he hosted SNL, Murphy joined the chorus of those bashing Best Defense, calling it "the worst movie in the history of everything". The same year he won a Grammy Award for Best Comedy Recording for his album Eddie Murphy: Comedian (He has been nominated for a total of three Grammy Awards).

Murphy starred in the successful action comedy film Beverly Hills Cop (1984). The film was Murphy's first solo leading role. Murphy was offered a part in Star Trek IV: The Voyage Home (1986), a role that, after being heavily re-written from comic relief to love interest, ultimately went to Catherine Hicks. By this time, Murphy's near-exclusive contract with Paramount Pictures rivaled Star Trek as Paramount's most lucrative franchise. By 1986, he launched Eddie Murphy Television Enterprises with a deal at Paramount Television.

Murphy starred in the supernatural comedy The Golden Child (1986). Although The Golden Child performed well at the box office, the movie was not as well received as 48 Hrs., Trading Places, and Beverly Hills Cop. The Golden Child was considered a change of pace for Murphy because of the supernatural setting as opposed to the "street smart" settings of his previous efforts. Not long afterward, he reprised his role of Axel Foley in the Tony Scott-directed Beverly Hills Cop II (1987). It was a box-office success, grossing almost $300 million worldwide. By the end of the decade, Murphy was Hollywood's biggest box office star. In 1988, Murphy and his Eddie Murphy Television Enterprises company had struck a deal with CBS.

1989–1998: Commercial decline and rebound
From 1989 onward, critical praise for Murphy's films declined, hitting a low point with the critically panned Beverly Hills Cop III (1994), a movie Murphy denounced during an appearance on Inside the Actors Studio. Box-office receipts also declined compared to his previous films, although he did find some box office success with Another 48 Hrs. (1990) and Boomerang (1992). On Harlem Nights (1989), Murphy worked as director, producer, star, and co-writer, with his brother, Charlie Murphy. The film featured Murphy's comic idols Richard Pryor and Redd Foxx in supporting roles.

During this period Murphy was criticized by filmmaker Spike Lee for not using his status to help Black actors break into film, although as Murphy's prominence increased, his films (especially those he produced) often had a mainly Black cast (Coming to America, Harlem Nights, Boomerang, Vampire in Brooklyn, Life). Many Black actors who later received greater recognition made early appearances in Murphy's films, such as Damon Wayans in Beverly Hills Cop, Halle Berry and Martin Lawrence in Boomerang, Samuel L. Jackson and Cuba Gooding Jr. in Coming to America, Dave Chappelle in The Nutty Professor, and Chris Rock in Beverly Hills Cop II. Naming The Nutty Professor his favorite comedy, Rock regards Murphy's performance in the film as being so great he had "been robbed of an Oscar", adding his various performances were "Peter Sellers-esque".

Although Murphy has enjoyed commercial success since Saturday Night Live, he did not participate in the making of the Live from New York: An Uncensored History of Saturday Night Live retrospective book by Tom Shales and James Andrew Miller (2002), nor did he ever attend cast reunions or anniversary specials until his appearance on the SNL 40th anniversary special. Murphy told Rolling Stone he distanced himself from the show because he was angry with David Spade over the latter's joke about Murphy's career during a segment on SNL, as well as with Lorne Michaels and the production staff for allowing the joke in the first place. Murphy and Spade have since reconciled.

1998–2018: Family-friendly films and Dreamgirls
Murphy followed The Nutty Professor with a series of successful family-friendly movies like Mulan (1998), Dr. Dolittle (also 1998) and its 2001 sequel, the Shrek series, Daddy Day Care (2003), and The Haunted Mansion (also 2003), along with Nutty Professor II: The Klumps (2000). However, most of his movies meant for more adult audiences performed moderately; Metro (1997), I Spy (2002), and Showtime (2002) all grossed less than $40 million domestically, Holy Man (1998) performed poorly, grossing less than $13 million, and The Adventures of Pluto Nash (2002) is on record as one of the biggest financial failures all time, grossing just $7 million worldwide on a reported massive $110 million budget. An exception to this run of poorly received adult-themed films was the Frank Oz comedy Bowfinger (1999), also starring Steve Martin. The film garnered generally positive critical reviews and grossed $98 million at the box-office.

Murphy starred in the motion picture version of the Broadway musical Dreamgirls (2006) as soul singer James "Thunder" Early. Murphy won a Golden Globe for Best Supporting Actor, as well as a Screen Actors Guild Award and a Broadcast Film Critics Association Award in that category. Several reviews for the film highlighted Murphy's performance while he received some pre-release Academy Awards buzz.

Murphy was nominated for an Academy Award for Best Supporting Actor on January 23, 2007, but lost to Alan Arkin for his performance in Little Miss Sunshine—it was speculated that one of the reasons Murphy lost out on winning the Academy Award was the negative reviews of his subsequent film Norbit, released in early February 2007. Murphy notoriously exited the 79th Academy Awards as soon as Arkin was announced the winner.

In 2007 Murphy was invited to join the Academy of Motion Picture Arts and Sciences.

Murphy co-starred in Tower Heist (2011), directed by Brett Ratner, alongside Ben Stiller, Matthew Broderick, and Casey Affleck. Murphy played a thief who joins a group of hardworking men who find out they have fallen victim to a wealthy businessman's Ponzi scheme, and conspire to rob his high-rise residence. It was reported in 2011 that Murphy would host the 84th Academy Awards in 2012. However, he dropped out of his hosting duties on November 9, 2011, in the wake of the Brett Ratner scandal.

On March 8, 2014, it was announced that Murphy would team up with Boomerang co-star Halle Berry in a new film titled Miles and Me. The film was also set to star Laurence Fishburne and was set to begin pre-production in 2014 from Paramount Pictures. No other word was released about the film or who else was attached. On March 15, 2015, it was announced that Murphy would play comedian Richard Pryor's father, LeRoy Pryor, in the upcoming biopic directed by Lee Daniels with Mike Epps playing Pryor; as of 2019, the project remains in development hell.

In February 2015, Murphy attended Saturday Night Live 40th Anniversary Special where Chris Rock introduced him in a special tribute dedicated to him. Murphy was greeted with an enthusiastic standing ovation from the crowd of comedians and stars, however he received criticism for his brief appearance, declining to tell any jokes, and for not reprising his iconic SNL characters.

On October 15, 2015, Murphy was awarded the Mark Twain Prize for American Humor at the Kennedy Center in Washington, D.C. Those who honored Murphy at the event included Dave Chappelle, Chris Rock, Trevor Noah, George Lopez, Kevin Nealon, Kathy Griffin, Tracy Morgan, Joe Piscopo, Jay Pharoah and Dick Gregory. Murphy co-starred with actress Britt Robertson in the drama Mr. Church (2016) for which he received critical acclaim.

2019–present: Career resurgence

In October 2019, Murphy produced and starred in Dolemite Is My Name as Rudy Ray Moore. The film was distributed on Netflix and received overwhelming critical acclaim. The film holds a 97% on Rotten Tomatoes with the critics consensus reading, "Eddie Murphy makes Dolemite Is My Name just as bold, brash, and ultimately hard to resist as its subject." For his work, Murphy received a Golden Globe Award nomination for the film.

In December 2019, Murphy returned to Saturday Night Live to promote Dolemite; this was his first time hosting since 1984. His hosting duties received overwhelming acclaim from audiences and critics alike, making it the highest watched episode since 2008 when Tina Fey played Sarah Palin. Comedians Dave Chappelle, Chris Rock, Tracy Morgan, and Kenan Thompson welcomed Murphy back in the opening monologue. Murphy went on to reprise his popular SNL characters such as Mr. Robinson, Gumby, Buckwheat, and Velvet Jones. Murphy won his first ever Primetime Emmy Award for Outstanding Guest Actor in a Comedy Series for hosting the episode.

Murphy and most of the cast reprised their roles in the Coming to America sequel Coming2 America, which was released in March 2021.

On December 6, 2013, it was announced that Murphy would star in the fourth film of the Beverly Hills Cop series. Brett Ratner was at the time set to direct the film, Jerry Bruckheimer was confirmed to produce the film, and Josh Appelbaum and Andre Nemec would write. In a June 2014 interview, Murphy discussed the plot of the film, saying it would take place and film in Detroit, bringing in an estimated $56.6 million to the state of Michigan. On June 14, 2016, it was confirmed that Murphy was still set to reprise his role as Axel Foley in a fourth film. In December 2019, it was reported that Netflix would distribute the film, which was ultimately directed by Mark Molloy. More recently, he and his Eddie Murphy Productions company signed a deal with Amazon Studios.

On March 31, 2022, it was announced that Murphy will portray George Clinton in an untitled biopic, with John Davis and Catherine Davis producing through Davis Entertainment.

Singing career
Murphy is also a singer, having frequently provided background vocals to songs released by the Bus Boys; the song "(The Boys Are) Back in Town" was featured in 48 Hrs. and Murphy's comedy special Eddie Murphy Delirious. As a solo artist, Murphy had two hit singles, "Party All the Time" (produced by Rick James) and "Put Your Mouth on Me", during the latter half of the 1980s. He had started singing earlier in his career, with the songs "Boogie in Your Butt" and "Enough Is Enough", the latter being a parody of Barbra Streisand's and Donna Summer's 1979 song, "No More Tears". Both songs appeared on his 1982 self-titled comedy album.

"Party All the Time" was featured on Murphy's debut album How Could It Be (1985), which included a minor follow-up R&B hit in the title track, a duet with vocalist Crystal Blake. This track was written by Rusty Hamilton and was produced by Stevie Wonder's cousin Aquil Fudge after a brief falling out with Rick James. In 2004, VH-1 and Blender voted "Party All the Time" number seven among the "50 Worst Songs of All-Time". Sharam used a sample of the song for the UK No.8 hit "PATT (Party All the Time)" in 2006. "Put Your Mouth on Me" appeared on Murphy's 1989 follow-up album, So Happy.

Murphy recorded the album Love's Alright in the early 1990s. He performed in a music video of the single "Whatzupwitu", featuring Michael Jackson. He recorded a duet with Shabba Ranks called "I Was a King". In 1992, Murphy appeared in the music video for Michael Jackson's "Remember the Time" alongside Magic Johnson and Iman.

Though uncredited, Murphy provided vocal work on SNL castmate Joe Piscopo's 1985 comedy single, "The Honeymooners Rap". Piscopo impersonated Jackie Gleason on the single, while Murphy provided an imitation of Art Carney.

In Coming to America, he imitated Jackie Wilson when he sang "To Be Loved", but because the character he was playing had a thick accent, he had to sing it in character; he also performed in the same film as the character Randy Watson, a small time club singer, a role he reprised in the 2021 sequel Coming 2 America.

Murphy performed several songs in the Shrek film franchise. In the first film, he performed a version of the Monkees' "I'm a Believer" in the film's final scene; in Shrek 2, he performed Ricky Martin's hit "Livin' La Vida Loca", along with co-star Antonio Banderas; Murphy performed "Thank You (Falletin Me Be Mice Elf Again)" for Shrek the Third, once again with Banderas.

In 2013, he released his first single in many years titled "Red Light", a reggae song featuring Snoop Dogg. He is also working on a new album titled 9.

Personal life

Family

Murphy had two sons in quick succession around the end of the 1980s: Eric (born c. 1989), with then-girlfriend Paulette McNeely; and Christian (born c. 1990), with then-girlfriend Tamara Hood.

Murphy began a longtime romantic relationship with Nicole Mitchell after meeting her in 1988 at an NAACP Image Awards show. They lived together for almost two years before getting married at the Grand Ballroom of the Plaza Hotel in New York City on March 18, 1993. Murphy and Mitchell have five children together: Bria, Myles, Shayne, Zola, and Bella. In August 2005, Mitchell filed for divorce, citing "irreconcilable differences". The divorce was finalized on April 17, 2006.

Following his divorce from Mitchell, in 2006, Murphy began dating former Spice Girl Melanie Brown, who became pregnant and said the child was Murphy's. When questioned about the pregnancy in December 2006, by RTL Boulevard, Murphy told Dutch reporter Matthijs Kleyn, "I don't know whose child that is until it comes out and has a blood test. You shouldn't jump to conclusions, sir." Brown gave birth to a baby girl, Angel Iris Murphy Brown, on Murphy's 46th birthday, April 3, 2007. On June 22, 2007, representatives for Brown announced that a DNA test had confirmed Murphy was the father. Brown had stated in an interview that Murphy has not sought a relationship with Angel, although it was later reported in 2010 that Murphy was getting to know her.

Murphy exchanged vows with film producer Tracey Edmonds, former wife of Kenneth "Babyface" Edmonds, on January 1, 2008, in a private ceremony on an island off Bora Bora. On January 16, 2008, the couple released a statement describing the ceremony as a "symbolic union": "After much consideration and discussion, we have jointly decided that we will forgo having a legal ceremony as it is not necessary to define our relationship further" and that they would "remain friends" instead of pursue a romantic relationship. Murphy bought property on Long Island, New York, later that year.

In May 2016, Murphy had a daughter by Australian model Paige Butcher, whom he has been dating since 2012. Murphy and Butcher are parents of a son born in November 2018. In September 2018 they became engaged to be married. Their son's middle name pays tribute to Murphy's late brother, Charlie, who died of leukemia in 2017.

Philanthropy
Murphy has donated money to the AIDS Healthcare Foundation, as well as cancer, education, creative arts, family support, health, and homeless charities. He has donated to the Martin Luther King Jr. Center, and $100,000 to the Screen Actors' Guild's strike relief fund.

Religion
Murphy is a baptized Catholic, and after saying so to Rolling Stone in 2011, he remarked, "But I don’t want to have no religion. I have Christian-based values and beliefs."

Prostitute incident
On May 2, 1997, Murphy was stopped by police in Santa Monica, California, with Atisone Seiuli, a transgender prostitute, in his car. His publicist, Paul Block, denied that Murphy had intended to pay Seiuli for sex, saying that Murphy was only giving her a ride home. Murphy was not charged with any crime, but the incident caused him a number of public relation problems.

Discography

How Could It Be (1985)
So Happy (1989)
Love's Alright (1993)

Filmography

Awards and nominations

References

External links

Eddie Murphy on Discogs

 
1961 births
20th-century American comedians
20th-century American male actors
20th-century African-American singers
20th-century American screenwriters
21st-century American comedians
21st-century American male actors
21st-century African-American singers
21st-century American screenwriters
Actors Fund of America
African-American male actors
African-American male comedians
African-American screenwriters
African-American male singer-songwriters
African-American stand-up comedians
African-American television producers
American impressionists (entertainers)
American male comedians
American male comedy actors
American male film actors
American male screenwriters
American male television actors
American male voice actors
American sketch comedians
American stand-up comedians
Annie Award winners
Best Supporting Actor Golden Globe (film) winners
Comedians from New York City
Grammy Award winners
Living people
LGBT-related scandals
Male actors from New York City
Mark Twain Prize recipients
Outstanding Performance by a Male Actor in a Supporting Role Screen Actors Guild Award winners
Paramount Pictures contract players
People from Bushwick, Brooklyn
People from Roosevelt, New York
Primetime Emmy Award winners
Screenwriters from New York (state)
Singer-songwriters from New York (state)
Television producers from New York City
Writers from Brooklyn
20th-century American male writers
21st-century American male writers